Milan Iloski (born July 29, 1999) is an American professional soccer player who plays as a forward and winger for USL Championship club Orange County SC.

Career

College and amateur 
Iloski played three years of college soccer at the University of California, Los Angeles between 2016 and 2019, scoring 23 goals and tallying 6 assists in 46 appearances.

Iloski also played with USL League Two sides FC Golden State Force and Ogden City SC.

Real Salt Lake
On January 15, 2020, Iloski signed as a Homegrown Player for Real Salt Lake of Major League Soccer. Iloski made his professional debut on March 7, 2020, appearing for Real Monarchs in the USL Championship in a 1–0 loss to San Antonio FC. Following the 2021 season, Iloski's contract option was declined by Salt Lake.

Orange County SC
On February 22, 2022, Iloski signed with USL Championship club Orange County SC. Iloski made his debut for OCSC on March 13, 2022, scoring the team's only goal in a 2-1 loss to Colorado Springs Switchbacks FC. On May 17, 2022, Iloski was named USL Championship Player of the Week for Week 10 of the 2022 season in recognition of his hat-trick in OCFC's 5-1 win against FC Tulsa. His hat-trick against Tulsa was the first in OCSC club history to be completed in a single half. On July 26, 2022, Iloski was named USL Championship Player of the Week for the second time during the 2022 season, this time for notching 2 goals and 2 assists during a 5-2 victory over LA Galaxy II in Week 20.

Honors
Individual
USL Championship Golden Boot: 2022

Personal 
Milan is the brother of fellow professional soccer players, Brian Iloski and Eric Iloski.

References

External links 
 
 
 Real Salt Lake Milan Iloski | Real Salt Lake

1999 births
Living people
American soccer players
Association football forwards
FC Golden State Force players
Homegrown Players (MLS)
Orange County SC players
Real Salt Lake players
Real Monarchs players
Soccer players from California
UCLA Bruins men's soccer players
United States men's youth international soccer players
USL Championship players
USL League Two players